Wilmer Kenzie Hicks (born July 14, 1942) is a former professional American football defensive back for the American Football League's Houston Oilers from 1964–1969, and for the National Football League's New York Jets from 1970-1972. Before his professional career, Hicks played for Texas Southern University.

See also
Other American Football League players

1942 births
Living people
People from Texarkana, Texas
American football cornerbacks
American football safeties
Florida Blazers players
Texas Southern Tigers football players
Houston Oilers players
American Football League All-Star players
New York Jets players
American Football League players